NA-202 Khairpur-I is a constituency for the National Assembly of Pakistan.

Election 2002 

General elections were held on 10 Oct 2002. Manzoor Wassan of PPP won by 62,447 votes.

Election 2008 

General elections were held on 18 Feb 2008. Nawab Ali Wassan of PPP won by 98,782 votes.

Election 2013 

General elections were held on 11 May 2013. Nawab Ali Wassan of PPP won by 91,809 votes and became the  member of National Assembly. However, this victory was declared null and void as the election Tribunal declared Wassan had used corrupt practices to secure his election and declared senior politician Ghous Ali Shah winner who had challenged electoral fraud.

Election 2018 

General elections are scheduled to be held on 25 July 2018.

See also
NA-201 Sukkur-II
NA-203 Khairpur-II

References

External links 
Election result's official website

NA-215